Alavoneh-ye Fay (also Romanized as ‘Alāvoneh-ye Fāy; also known as Fāy and Olfāy-e ‘Alāvoneh) is a village in Karkheh Rural District, Hamidiyeh District, Ahvaz County, Khuzestan Province, Iran. At the 2006 census, its population was 1,633, in 253 families.

References 

Populated places in Ahvaz County